Gordon was a constituency of the Scottish Parliament. It elected one Member of the Scottish Parliament (MSP) by the first past the post method of election. It was one of nine constituencies in the North East Scotland electoral region, which elected seven additional members, in addition to nine constituency MSPs, to produce a form of proportional representation for the region as a whole.

Electoral region

At the time of this constituency the other eight constituencies of the North East Scotland region were Aberdeen Central, Aberdeen North, Aberdeen South, Angus, Banff and Buchan, Dundee East, Dundee West and West Aberdeenshire and Kincardine

The electoral region covered the Aberdeenshire, Aberdeen City and Dundee City council areas; part of Angus; and small parts of Moray and Perth and Kinross.

Constituency boundaries
The Gordon constituency was created at the same time as the Scottish Parliament, in 1999, with the name and boundaries of an existing Westminster constituency. In 2005, however, the boundaries of the Westminster (House of Commons) constituency were subject to some alteration.

Council areas
The Scottish Parliament constituency of Gordon covered a central portion of the Aberdeenshire council area and a small eastern portion of the Moray council area. The rest of the Aberdeenshire area was covered by two other constituencies, both also in the North East Scotland electoral region: Banff and Buchan to the north of the Gordon constituency, and West Aberdeenshire and Kincardine to the south. The rest of the Moray area was covered by the Moray constituency, which is in the Highlands and Islands region.

Boundary Review

Following their First Periodic review of constituencies to the Scottish Parliament, the Boundary Commission for Scotland replaced Gordon with the seat called Aberdeenshire East.

Member of the Scottish Parliament
The seat was represented since the 2007 election by Alex Salmond, the First Minister. He was previously MSP for Banff and Buchan from 1999 until resigning in 2001; he also represented the Westminster seat of Banff and Buchan from 1987 until retiring from the UK Parliament in 2010.

Election results

References

Politics of Aberdeenshire
Politics of Moray
Scottish Parliament constituencies and regions 1999–2011
1999 establishments in Scotland
Constituencies established in 1999
2011 disestablishments in Scotland
Constituencies disestablished in 2011
Ellon, Aberdeenshire
Turriff
Huntly
Inverurie
Keith, Moray
Alex Salmond